Events in the year 1893 in Iceland.

Incumbents 

 Monarch: Christian IX
 Minister for Iceland: Johannes Nellemann

Events 

 Alexander Keith Johnston publishes a map of the Island of Iceland.

Births 

 12 February – Steingrímur Steinþórsson, prime minister
 20 May – Ásmundur Sveinsson, sculptor
 12 October – Páll Ísólfsson, composer

References 

 
1890s in Iceland
Years of the 19th century in Iceland
Iceland
Iceland